Nagari numerals may be,
Bengali numerals
Devanagari numerals